Ashton College is a private, post-secondary educational institution, with campus located in Vancouver in British Columbia, Canada. It was founded in 1998 as Ashton College Institute of Business, with a focus on business courses. Since then, it has simplified its name to Ashton College and developed into an institution that offers diplomas, certifications, and vocational training in an online and in-person environment. Ashton College also supports foreign professionals obtain licensing to practice in Canada.

See also
 List of Colleges in British Columbia
 Higher education in British Columbia

References

External links 
 

Universities and colleges in Vancouver
Colleges in British Columbia
1998 establishments in British Columbia
Educational institutions established in 1998
Education in Abbotsford, British Columbia
Private universities and colleges in Canada